123 (one hundred [and] twenty-three) is the natural number following 122 and preceding 124.

In mathematics
123 is a Lucas number. It is the eleventh member of the Mian-Chowla sequence.
Along with 6, 123 is one of only two positive integers that is simultaneously two more than a perfect square and two less than a perfect cube (123 = 112 + 2 = 53 - 2).
 123 is the first whole number containing numbers from 1 to 3

In religion
The Book of Numbers says that Aaron died at the age of 123.

In telephony
The emergency telephone number in Colombia
The telephone number of the speaking clock for the correct time in the United Kingdom
The electricity (PLN) emergency telephone number in Indonesia
The medical emergency telephone number in Egypt
The Notation for national and international telephone numbers Recommendation ITU-T Recommendation E.123 defines a standard way to write telephone numbers, e-mail addresses, and web addresses

In other fields
123 is also:
123 (film), a 2002 Indian film
123 (interbank network), shared cash network in Egypt
123 (New Jersey bus)
"1-2-3", 1965 song written and recorded by Len Barry
The atomic number of the yet-to-be-discovered element unbitrium

See also
1-2-3 (disambiguation)
123rd (disambiguation)
AD 123
123 BC
List of highways numbered 123
Section 123 Agreement of the U.S. Atomic Energy Act of 1954
United Nations Security Council Resolution 123
Japan Airlines Flight 123, world's deadliest single-aircraft accident in history
Raz, Dwa, Trzy, Polish music band
Raz, dwa, trzy (newspaper), Polish sports weekly
Sonnet 123 by William Shakespeare
The Lotus 1-2-3 spreadsheet program

References

Integers